The climate of Saudi Arabia is marked by high temperatures during the day and low temperatures at night. The country follows the pattern of the desert climate, with the exception of the southwest, which features a semi-arid climate.

See also
 Effects of global warming

References 

Environment of Saudi Arabia
Saudi Arabia
Saudi Arabia articles needing attention